Bailey Falter (born April 24, 1997) is an American professional baseball pitcher for the Philadelphia Phillies of Major League Baseball (MLB). The Phillies selected Falter in the fifth round of the 2015 Major League Baseball draft. He made his MLB debut in 2021.

Early life 
Falter was born on April 24, 1997, in Chino Hills, California. As a sophomore at Chino Hills High School in 2013, Falter pitched his first complete game no-hitter, striking out 16 batters in an 11-0 victory over Bloomington High School.

Career

The Philadelphia Phillies selected Falter in the fifth round (144th overall) of the 2015 Major League Baseball draft. After signing, he made his professional debut with the GCL Phillies. In 2016, Falter spent the season with the Low-A Williamsport Crosscutters, pitching to a 1-6 record and 3.17 ERA with 59 strikeouts in 59.2 innings of work. He spent the next year with the Single-A Lakewood BlueClaws, recording a 8-7 record and 2.99 ERA in 21 games. 

In 2018, Falter spent the year in High-A ball with the Clearwater Threshers, registering a 8-4 record and 2.69 ERA in 93.2 innings pitched. Falter spent the 2019 season with the Double-A Reading Phillies, pitching to a 6-5 record and 3.84 ERA in 14 appearances.

Falter did not play in a game in 2020 due to the cancellation of the Minor League Baseball season because of the COVID-19 pandemic. The Phillies added him to their 40-man roster after the 2020 season.

On April 20, 2021, Falter was promoted to the major leagues for the first time. On April 25, Falter made his MLB debut against the Colorado Rockies, allowing 2 runs in 2.0 innings pitched. In the game, he also notched his first MLB strikeout, punching out Rockies infielder Ryan McMahon.

In the 2022 regular season with the Phillies, he was 6-4 with a 3.86 ERA in 20 games (16 starts) covering 84 innings.

Pitcher profile 
Falter employs a unique pitching delivery inspired by Sandy Koufax. He takes a long stride when throwing the ball, and releases the pitch from his hand closer to home plate than many other pitchers.

References

External links

1997 births
Living people
People from Chino Hills, California
Baseball players from California
Major League Baseball pitchers
Philadelphia Phillies players
Florida Complex League Phillies players
Williamsport Crosscutters players
Lakewood BlueClaws players
Clearwater Threshers players
Indios de Mayagüez players
Reading Fightin Phils players